Gurev Gap (Gureva Sedlovina \'gu-re-va se-dlo-vi-'na\) is a flat ice-covered saddle of elevation 450 m extending 3 km in south-north direction between Hemus Peak and Gleaner Heights in eastern Livingston Island in the South Shetland Islands, Antarctica.  The gap separates the glacial catchments of Kaliakra Glacier to the east, and Saedinenie Snowfield and Perunika Glacier to the west. It is part of the overland route from the St. Kliment Ohridski Base via the Balkan Snowfield, Rezen Saddle and Perunika Glacier to Varna Peninsula.  The saddle was first trekked on 24 December 2004 by the Tangra 2004/05 Survey team from Camp Academia, and was named for Vasil Gurev, physicist at St. Kliment Ohridski in 1994/95 and subsequent seasons.

Location

Maps
 L.L. Ivanov. Livingston Island: Central-Eastern Region. Scale 1:25000 topographic map.  Sofia: Antarctic Place-names Commission of Bulgaria, 1996.
 S. Soccol, D. Gildea and J. Bath. Livingston Island, Antarctica. Scale 1:100000 satellite map. The Omega Foundation, USA, 2004.
 L.L. Ivanov et al., Antarctica: Livingston Island and Greenwich Island, South Shetland Islands (from English Strait to Morton Strait, with illustrations and ice-cover distribution), 1:100000 scale topographic map, Antarctic Place-names Commission of Bulgaria, Sofia, 2005
 L.L. Ivanov. Antarctica: Livingston Island and Greenwich, Robert, Snow and Smith Islands. Scale 1:120000 topographic map. Troyan: Manfred Wörner Foundation, 2010.  (First edition 2009. )
 Antarctic Digital Database (ADD). Scale 1:250000 topographic map of Antarctica. Scientific Committee on Antarctic Research (SCAR). Since 1993, regularly upgraded and updated.
 A. Kamburov and L. Ivanov. Bowles Ridge and Central Tangra Mountains: Livingston Island, Antarctica. Scale 1:25000 map. Sofia: Manfred Wörner Foundation, 2023.

References
 Gurev Gap. SCAR Composite Antarctic Gazetteer
 Bulgarian Antarctic Gazetteer. Antarctic Place-names Commission. (details in Bulgarian, basic data in English)

External links
 Gurev Gap. Copernix satellite image

Mountain passes of Livingston Island